Thomas Powys, 1st Baron Lilford (4 May 1743 – 26 January 1800) was a British politician who sat in the House of Commons from 1774 to 1797 when he was raised to the peerage as Baron Lilford.

Biography
Powys was the eldest son of Thomas Powys of Lilford Hall, Northamptonshire. He attended Eton College from 1755 to 1759 and in 1760 was admitted as fellow-commoner to King's College, Cambridge. He succeeded his father in 1767 and was appointed was High Sheriff of Northamptonshire for 1768–69.

Powys was elected to the House of Commons for Northamptonshire in 1774, a seat he held until 1797. The latter year he was raised to the peerage as Baron Lilford, of Lilford in the County of Northampton.

Personal life
The family seat was Lilford Hall, first acquired by his great-grandfather, the judge, Thomas Powys. He was the son of Thomas Powys (24 Sep 1719 - 2 Apr 1767), only son heir of his gt-uncle Littleton Powys, and Henrietta Spencer ( - 1771). In 1770 he sold Henley Hall to Ralph Knight, who reconstructed the house.

Lord Lilford died in January 1800, aged 56, and was succeeded in the barony by his eldest son Thomas Powys.

Lord Lilford had married Mary, daughter of Galfridus Mann, in 1772 and had six sons and seven daughters. Lady Lilford died in 1823.

Arms

References 

Kidd, Charles, Williamson, David (editors). Debrett's Peerage and Baronetage (1990 edition). New York: St Martin's Press, 1990

1743 births
1800 deaths
People educated at Eton College
Alumni of King's College, Cambridge
High Sheriffs of Northamptonshire
Members of the Parliament of Great Britain for English constituencies
British MPs 1774–1780
British MPs 1780–1784
British MPs 1784–1790
British MPs 1790–1796
British MPs 1796–1800
Thomas 1
Peers of Great Britain created by George III
People from North Northamptonshire
Presidents of the Oxford Union